Dumelang Saleshando is a politician from Botswana who served as the Leader of the Opposition of Botswana from 2019-2022. He was replaced by Dithapelo Keorapetse.

Early life and education
Saleshando was born on 13 September 1971, is the firstborn of five sons to Gilson Saleshando, a politician, and Keatlaretse Dolly Saleshando, a nurse. He attended numerous schools growing up in Kanye, Lobatse, Selebi-Phikwe and was brought up in the Seventh-day Adventist Church. He completed his schooling at St Joseph's College, where he became a member of the Botswana Socialist Youth, before enrolling in a degree in economics and political science at the University of Botswana in 1992.

Career
After university, Saleshando joined First National Bank Botswana as a trainee manager but he was summarily dismissed for leaking information about the finances of the ruling party. In 2003, Saleshando started campaigning for Gaborone Central parliamentary seat in the capital Gaborone. The seat was previously held by Michael Dingake, the former leader of Botswana Congress Party. Saleshando was elected to parliament as the Member of Parliament  for Gaborone Central after defeating incumbent Hon Dr Margaret Nasha in 2004. He was re-elected as a Member of Parliament for the same constituency in the 2009 general elections and was elected party president unopposed in July 2010, after his father, Gilson Saleshando stepped down as party leader.

Prior to taking up the BCP leadership role, he served in the party Central Committee as Information and Publicity Secretary. His father was initially opposed to the idea of being succeeded by his son, noting that it was not proper since many people will believe that the party was run by a dynasty. He gave up when many people in the party endorsed the young Saleshando for the position. He lost the elections in the 2014 general elections to Phenyo Butale of the coalition Umbrella for Democratic Change under the Botswana Movement for Democracy.

Personal life
Saleshando married Dineo in 2002 and they have two sons and a daughter. His son Seabo Saleshando a typical kid who plays tennis and ranked as one of Botswanas top players.

References

Botswana Congress Party politicians
Living people
1971 births